The Tour de l'Espoir is a stage cycling race held annually in Cameroon. It is part of the UCI Under 23 Nations' Cup.

Winners

External links

References

Cycle races in Cameroon
Recurring sporting events established in 2018
UCI Africa Tour races